René-Joseph-Hyacinthe Bertin (1757–1828) was a French anatomist known for his pioneer work in cardiology. He was the son of the anatomist Exupère Joseph Bertin.

Early life and education

Bertin was born in Gohard, France on 10 April 1757. His father was Exupère-Joseph Bertin, who was a prominent physician remembered for his description on invaginated renal cortical tissue columns of Bertin. After studying in Paris, Bertin graduated from medical school at the University of Montpellier in 1791.

Career

Bertin was a military physician during the French Revolution and in the Napoleonic wars. After his military service, Bertin then returned to Paris and became the physician-in-chief at Hôpital Cochin. He specialized in disorders of the cardiovascular system with his assistant Jean Baptiste Bouillaud.

Bertin was an early advocate of auscultation for elucidating the pathologies of cardiovascular disorders. He developed insight into the physical principles responsible for heart murmurs associated with valvular stenosis.

Bertin was especially interested in cardiac hypertrophy and originated the idea of having three designations of cardiac hypertrophy, which he called "eccentric", "concentric" and "simple" hypertrophy of the heart.

He was the author of Traité des Maladies du Coeur et des Gros Vaisseaux (Treatise of Diseases of the Heart and Major Vessels), an important work on the pathological anatomy of the heart. In this book, he discusses topics such as auscultation, valvular deformities, and hypertrophy of the heart. His student Jean-Baptiste Bouillaud assisted him with this edition.

Death

Bertin died on 15 August 1828 in Fougères, France.

Written works 

Copied from the equivalent article at the French Wikipedia.
 Mémoire sur les maladies de la Guadeloupe, et ce qui peut y avoir rapport, 1778
 Doctrine médicale simplifiée, ou Éclaircissement et confirmation du nouveau système de médecine de Brown, 1798. (with  Melchior Adam Weikard, Joseph Frank)
 Quelques observations critiques, philosophiques et médicales sur l'Angleterre, les anglais et les français détenus dans les prisons de Plymouth, 1800
 Traité des maladies du coeur et des gros vaisseaux, 1824. (with Jean Baptiste Bouillaud)

References

 

French cardiologists
French anatomists
1757 births
1828 deaths
19th-century French physicians